Mathilde of Bavaria may refer to:
 Princess Mathilde of Bavaria (1813–1862), daughter of Ludwig I of Bavaria and wife of Louis III, Grand Duke of Hesse
 Princess Mathilde of Bavaria (1877–1906), daughter of Ludwig III of Bavaria and wife of Prince Ludwig Gaston of Saxe-Coburg and Gotha
 Mathilde of Bavaria, Margravine of Meissen (1313–1346), daughter of Louis IV, Holy Roman Emperor and wife of Frederick II, Margrave of Meissen
 Mechthild of Bavaria (1532-1565), daughter of William IV, Duke of Bavaria and wife of Philibert, Margrave of Baden-Baden
 Duchess Mathilde Ludovika in Bavaria (1843-1925) daughter of Duke Maximilian Joseph in Bavaria and wife of Prince Louis, Count of Trani